Jorge Córdova Olivares (5 April 1913 – 7 June 1989) was a Chilean footballer. He played in eleven matches for the Chile national football team from 1937 to 1939. He was also part of Chile's squad for the 1937 South American Championship.

References

External links
 

1913 births
1989 deaths
Chilean footballers
Chile international footballers
Place of birth missing
Association football defenders
Magallanes footballers